Bo Larsson (7 September 1927 – 29 November 1977) was a Swedish water polo player. He competed in the men's tournament at the 1952 Summer Olympics.

References

1927 births
1977 deaths
Swedish male water polo players
Olympic water polo players of Sweden
Water polo players at the 1952 Summer Olympics
People from Västmanland